The Military Vehicle Preservation Association (MVPA) is an association whose mission is 'To provide an international organization for military vehicle enthusiasts, historians, preservationists and collectors interested in the acquisition, restoration, preservation, safe operation and public education of historic military transport.'

The association was originally started as the MVCC - Military Vehicle Collectors Club. After a number of years, it was changed to the IMVCC - International Military Vehicle Collectors Club, to reflect the increasing interest and influx of non-American collectors. But after just a couple of years it changed to its current name.

In 2019, the group organized a cross country trip commemorating the 100th anniversary of the 1919 Motor Transport Corps convoy, which involved 81 Army vehicles traveling from Washington, DC to San Francisco. The re-enactment included over 40 classic military vehicles, and traveled from York, Pennsylvania to San Francisco. The group has completed five transcontinental convoys.

Publications

From its early days, member publications have been central to providing and sharing historic military vehicle (HMV) information. The acclaimed ARMY MOTORS began in 1976, with SUPPLY LINE (a spin-off of the ARMY MOTORS Supply Room section) joining in 1978. Since April / May 1987, the club published a bimonthly glossy and informational magazine, called ARMY MOTORS Magazine, to inform collectors and restorers on all types and all years of military vehicles and parts. ARMY MOTORS had been reduced to four issues yearly, next to the bimonthly publication of SUPPLY LINE magazine. Contrary to ARMY MOTORS, which aimed to offer high quality writing, articles and photography, without advertising, SUPPLY LINE focused on restoring tips, parts, products, and includes much advertising. Both publications were considered benchmarks in the HMV hobby. 

With the retirement of ARMY MOTORS' editor, Reg Hodgson, the two publications were combined to create HISTORY IN MOTION, the current publication of the MVPA The full-color. Published by the Military Vehicle Preservation Association Historic Archives, the full-color, perfect-bound publication is the leader in the hobby and is available in either print or electronic delivery to all members of the MVPA. View an online sample HERE

References

External links 
 Official website of the Military Vehicle Preservation Association

Military vehicle preservation